Ian Williams (born June 17, 1979) is a Canadian poet and fiction writer.

Williams is the author of Personals (poems, 2012), which was shortlisted for the Griffin Poetry Prize and the Robert Kroetsch Poetry Book Award. His collection of short stories, Not Anyone's Anything, won the Danuta Gleed Literary Award.  His first book of poetry, You Know Who You Are, was shortlisted for the ReLit Awards.

Williams earned Honours B.Sc., M.A., and Ph.D. degrees from the University of Toronto.  He is currently a professor of creative writing at the University of British Columbia, as well as a trustee of The Griffin Trust For Excellence In Poetry.

His debut novel, Reproduction, was published in 2019, and was awarded the 2019 Giller Prize. It was also shortlisted for the 2019 Amazon.ca First Novel Award, and the 2019 Toronto Book Awards.

His poetry collection Word Problems was shortlisted for the ReLit Award for poetry in 2021, and won the Raymond Souster Award from the League of Canadian Poets.

His essay collection Disorientation was shortlisted for the 2021 Hilary Weston Writers' Trust Prize for Nonfiction.

Books
 You Know Who You Are (Wolsak and Wynn, 2010)
 Not Anyone's Anything (Freehand Books, 2011)
 Personals (Freehand Books, 2012), shortlisted for the 2013 Canadian Griffin Poetry Prize
 Reproduction (Random House Canada, 2019), winner of the 2019 Scotiabank Giller Prize
 Word Problems (Coach House Books, 2020)
 Disorientation: Being Black in the World (Random House Canada, 2021)

References

External links
 

1979 births
Living people
21st-century Canadian poets
21st-century Canadian short story writers
21st-century Canadian male writers
21st-century Canadian novelists
21st-century Canadian non-fiction writers
Canadian male poets
Canadian male short story writers
Canadian male novelists
Canadian male essayists
People from Brampton
Writers from Ontario
Black Canadian writers
Academic staff of the University of British Columbia